The royal standards of Canada are a set of uniquely Canadian personal flags used by members of the Canadian royal family. They are used to denote the presence of the bearer within any car, ship, airplane, building, or area, within Canada or when representing Canada abroad. There are currently five personal royal standards, one each for the Prince of Wales, the Princess Royal, the Duke of York, and the Duke of Edinburgh, as well as one standard for use more generally to denote the presence of any member of the royal family who has not previously been provided with a specific personal standard. The flags are part of a larger collection of Canadian royal symbols.

Members of the royal family
There are currently five variants of the sovereign's royal standard, each of which were approved by Queen Elizabeth II by letters patent for a specific member of Canada's royal family: Prince William, Prince of Wales; Princess Anne, Princess Royal; Prince Andrew, Duke of York; and Prince Edward, Duke of Edinburgh. The sixth variant is used by any other member of the royal family who has not been presented by the Crown with a personal Canadian standard. All were created by the Canadian Heraldic Authority, the first two that came after Queen Elizabeth II's being the banners for then-Prince Charles, Prince of Wales, and Prince William, then-Duke of Cambridge. These were developed over a three-month period and revealed 29 June 2011, just prior to that year's royal tour by the Duke and Duchess of Cambridge; The ermine bordered royal standard was registered 15 January 2015 for use by members of the royal family who do not have a personal standard for use in Canada.

William's flag at the time was first flown from the cockpit window of the Canadian Forces airplane that carried he and his wife to Canada in 2011, as it taxied after landing at Ottawa. Prince Charles' flag was first unfurled 20 May 2012, at CFB Gagetown, from the cockpit window of the taxiing Royal Canadian Air Force airplane that brought he and Camilla, Duchess of Cornwall, to Canada for royal tour marking the Diamond Jubilee of Elizabeth II. The Princess Royal's banner was first used during her October 2013 visits to CFB Borden and CFB Kingston. Prince Edward's standard was first used during his visit to British Columbia's Government House, at the start of a royal tour by he and his wife, on 12 September 2014.

All variants are in a 1:2 proportion. The personal standards consist of the escutcheon of the Royal Arms of Canada defaced with both a blue roundel surrounded by a wreath and a white label of three points. The wreath on Prince William's banner is of 24 gold maple leaves, the roundel depicts the Prince of Wales' feathers, and the label is not charged, signifying the eldest son of the monarch. The remainder of the personal banners have wreaths of 24 gold maple leaves only and in the centre of the roundel is the flag bearer's cypher: the initial of their Christian name surmounted by a coronet of the child of the monarch, which was the rank the bearers held when granted the standards. On the royal standard of the Princess Royal, the label is charged with a red heart at centre and the other two with red crosses, taken from the Princess' coat of arms; the centre label on the royal standard of the Duke of York is charged with a blue anchor, taken from the Prince's coat of arms; and the Duke of Edinburgh's standard has within the centre label a Tudor Rose.

Former standards
The royal standard, also called The Queen's Personal Canadian Flag, was a heraldic banner adopted and proclaimed by Queen Elizabeth II in 1962 for her use in her capacity as Queen of Canada. With its introduction, red and white, first proclaimed by George V in 1921, became entrenched as the national colours of Canada, and it was added to the Canadian Heraldic Authority's Public Register of Arms, Flags, and Badges on 15 March 2005. Different standards were used by Elizabeth in some of the other Commonwealth realms, and she held another banner for use as Head of the Commonwealth.

The flag, in a 1:2 proportion, consists of the escutcheon of the Royal Coat of Arms of Canada in banner form defaced with the distinct device of Queen Elizabeth II used on her Head of the Commonwealth flag: a blue roundel with the initial E surmounted by St Edward's Crown and within a wreath of roses, all gold-coloured. The standard is protected under the Trade-marks Act; section 9(a) states: "No person shall adopt in connection with a business, as a trade-mark or otherwise, any mark consisting of, or so nearly resembling as to be likely to be mistaken for... the Royal Arms, Crest, or Standard." The symbols on the flag represent the nations that colonized Canada, which are England (Royal Arms of England), Scotland (Royal Banner of Scotland), Ireland (coat of arms of Ireland) and France (a symbol of  Early modern France), alongside the national symbol (maple leaf).
Before he was made Prince of Wales in 2022, William's flag had a wreath of each 12 gold maple leaves and scallop shells, the roundel bore a depiction of his cypher (a W surmounted by a coronet of his rank), and the label was charged with a red shell, reminiscent of the coat of arms of his mother, Diana, Princess of Wales.

Use and protocol

Prior to the adoption of the Canadian royal standards, members of the royal family who toured Canada used the royal standard they employed when in the United Kingdom; after 1931, each of those standards took on a dual role of representing a member of either the British or the Canadian royal family, depending on the context. Only during a 2009 tour by Prince Charles and his wife, Camilla, Duchess of Cornwall, did the Prince of Wales use the British standard for members of the Royal Family who are not entitled to a personal standard of their own, rather than the standard used by the Prince of Wales for England and Wales.

The King's personal Canadian flag is employed only when the King is in Canada or is attending an event abroad as the Canadian head of state; for example, the flag will be unfurled at Juno Beach in France when the King is present there for commemorations of the Normandy Landings. The flag must be broken immediately upon the sovereign's arrival and lowered directly after his departure from any building, ship, aircraft, or other space or vehicle. On land, as per Department of National Defence protocol, the King's standard must be flown from a flagpole bearing as a pike head the crest of the Canadian royal arms. As the monarch is the personification of the Canadian state, his banner also takes precedence above all other flags in Canada, including the national flag and those of the other members of the Canadian royal family.

No other person may use the flag; the King's federal representative, the governor general, possesses a unique personal flag, as does each of the monarch's provincial viceroys. Flags are kept at the King's Ottawa residence, Rideau Hall, and supplied to Department of Canadian Heritage royal visit staff by the household staff prior to the King's arrival.

Protocol is sometimes, though rarely, officially broken. On 9 August 1902, the day of the coronation of King Edward VII, the monarch's royal standard (then the same in Canada as in the United Kingdom) was raised on a temporary flag pole at His Majesty's Dockyard in Halifax, Nova Scotia. Similarly, for the coronation of Queen Elizabeth II on 2 June 1953, the sovereign's royal standard was broken atop the Peace Tower on Parliament Hill in Ottawa. Sixty years later, on 6 February 2012, the Queen's personal standard for Canada was unfurled at Rideau Hall and Parliament Hill, as well as at other legislatures across the country to mark the monarch's diamond anniversary of her accession to the throne; permission to do so was granted by the Queen.

When Police Service Horse Burmese was presented to Queen Elizabeth II by the Royal Canadian Mounted Police on 28 April 1969, Her Majesty requested that Burmese perform in the Royal Windsor Horse Show and have the rider carry the Queen's royal standard on the lance, instead of the usual red and white pennon, thus allowing Elizabeth to easily follow Burmese's performance.

Coronation standard
During the coronation ceremony of the monarch at Westminster Abbey, the "standards" of various countries are carried by various officials in the procession inside the abbey. These flags are the country's coat of arms as a banner of arms. For Canada, similar standards based on the previous coat of arms were used thrice: at the coronations of King George V, King George VI and Queen Elizabeth II in 1911, 1937, and 1953, respectively. The banner of the coat of arms of the first four Canadian provinces was used in 1911, with the banner of the 1921-1957 version of the arms used in 1937 and 1953. The banner was in a 3:4 ratio and without defacement.

See also

 List of Canadian flags
 National symbols of Canada

References

External links

 Public Register of Arms, Flags, and Badges > Registration of the Flag of Her Majesty the Queen for personal use in Canada
 Canadian Flags of the Royal Family
 Head of State The Flags of Canada, by Alistair B. Fraser

Monarchy in Canada
Personal flags of Canada
Canadian heraldry
Elizabeth II flags
Charles III flags
Canada